The Snoqualmie Indian Tribe (S·dukʷalbixʷ), is a federally recognized tribe of Snoqualmie people. They are Coast Salish Native American peoples from the Snoqualmie Valley in east King and Snohomish Counties in Washington state. Other names for the Snoqualmies include Snoqualmu, Snoqualmoo, Snoqualmick, Snoqualamuke, and Snuqualmi.

History
Some Snoqualmies settled onto the Tulalip Reservation after signing the Point Elliott Treaty with the Washington Territory in 1855, but many remained in their ancestral homelands around the Snoqualmie Valley and Lake Sammamish. At that time they were one of the largest tribes in the Puget Sound region numbering around 4,000. In 1937 the Federal Government proposed granting a reservation though in the end the land was never given. The tribe lost federal recognition in 1953. In October 1999, the Bureau of Indian Affairs once again granted recognition to the Snoqualmie.

They purchased land for and were granted a reservation near Snoqualmie, Washington, on which the tribe opened the Snoqualmie Casino in 2008. They have tried and failed on several occasions to secure a reservation on their ancestral lands along the Tolt River (a tributary of the Snoqualmie River) until the Snoqualmie Tribe Ancestral Forest was purchased by the tribe at the end of 2021. The  in East King County holds environmental, economic, and historic value to the tribe. The land, most recently used for industrial timber, will be sustainably harvested while the ecosystem is managed to support the native plant and wildlife populations.

Government 
The Snoqualmie Tribe is governed by a Tribal constitution and an elected Council. The Tribe's governing structure includes building codes, health codes and other standard governmental functions.

References

Further reading
 Tweddell, Colin E. The Snoqualmie-Duwamish Dialects of Puget Sound Coast Salish: An Outline of Phonemics and Morphology. University of Washington publications in anthropology, v. 12. Seattle: University of Washington Press, 1950.

External links 

 Snoqualmie Tribe, Official Snoqualmie Tribe web site
 Snoqualmie Rights Day, Official information about Snoqualmie Rights Day and tribal sovereignty 
 Snoqualmie Tribe Culture Department, Official web site of the Snoqualmie Tribe Culture Department

Coast Salish governments
Federally recognized tribes in the United States
Native American tribes in Washington (state)
King County, Washington